German submarine U-196 was a Type IXD2 U-boat of Nazi Germany's Kriegsmarine during World War II. The submarine was laid down on 10 June 1941 at the AG Weser yard in Bremen, launched on 24 April 1942, and commissioned on 11 September 1942 under the command of Kapitänleutnant Eitel-Friedrich Kentrat. After training with the 4th U-boat Flotilla at Stettin, U-196 was transferred to the 12th flotilla for front-line service on 1 April 1943.

Design
German Type IXD2 submarines were considerably larger than the original Type IXs. U-196 had a displacement of  when at the surface and  while submerged. She had two shafts and two  propellers.

U-196 was fitted with six  torpedo tubes (four fitted at the bow and two at the stern), 24 torpedoes, two  SK C/32 naval gun, 240 rounds, and a  SK C/30 with 2575 rounds as well as two  C/30 anti-aircraft guns with 8100 rounds. The boat had a complement of fifty-five.

Service history

First patrol
Under Kentrat's command she completed the longest patrol made by a submarine during World War II, leaving Kiel on 13 March 1943, and returning to Bordeaux on 23 October 1943, spending 225 days at sea. During that time she sailed all the way around the coast of South Africa and sank two British merchant ships in the Indian Ocean.

Second patrol
En route she sank a British freighter in the Indian Ocean. U-196 arrived at Penang on 10 August 1944.

Third patrol
U-196 was transferred to the 33rd U-boat Flotilla on 1 October 1944. On 30 November, U-196 left Batavia (Java, in Indonesia), now commanded by Oberleutnant zur See Werner Striegler. After departure U-196 was reassigned to refuel a sister U-boat in the Indian Ocean, but the rendezvous never took place. Efforts to contact U-196 during early December 1944 failed to elicit a response.

When she failed to return to Jakarta and failed repeatedly to signal her position, she was listed as missing in the Sunda Straits south of Java, effective from 12 December 1944.

Her wreck has never been found. The cause of U-196s sinking remains unknown. It has been suggested that she struck an Allied mine laid by the British submarine . However, Porpoise did not lay the mines until 9 December 1944.

Oberleutnant zur See Dr. Ing. Heinz Haake of U-196 is buried in a graveyard at Bogor, Java with members of the World War I German East Asia Squadron at Arca Domas, on the slopes of Mount Pangrango, Java. His date of death is listed on a memorial as 30 November 1944, the day U-196 sailed on her last voyage.

Summary of raiding history

References

Bibliography

External links

 U-Historia

1942 ships
World War II submarines of Germany
German Type IX submarines
U-boats commissioned in 1942
Missing U-boats of World War II
Indian Ocean U-Boats
Ships built in Bremen (state)
U-boats sunk by unknown causes
Maritime incidents in December 1944